Frank Killam (September 3, 1843 – April 23, 1911) was a Canadian politician and a member of the House of Commons of Canada for the riding of Yarmouth in Nova Scotia.

Biography
He was born in Yarmouth, Nova Scotia in 1843, the son of Thomas Killam and Elizabeth Gale Dudman, and was educated in Yarmouth and Sackville, New Brunswick. Killam entered business in Yarmouth. In September 1867, he married Ellen Hood. On September 21, 1867, he lost his left arm when a cannon prematurely detonated during an election celebration. The accident killed one person. Following the death of his father, he ran for his father's former seat in the 1st Canadian Parliament in a by-election held on April 20, 1869. He was elected as a member of the Liberal Party.

Like his father, he had worked as a merchant and a shipowner. He was re-elected three times before being defeated in the 1882 federal election. In 1870, he was the president of the Western Counties Railway Company.

Electoral record

References 

1843 births
1911 deaths
Liberal Party of Canada MPs
Members of the House of Commons of Canada from Nova Scotia
People from Yarmouth, Nova Scotia